Jules Sylvain (20 December 1925 – 24 November 2016) was a Canadian weightlifter. He competed at the 1952 Summer Olympics and the 1956 Summer Olympics.

References

1925 births
2016 deaths
Canadian male weightlifters
Olympic weightlifters of Canada
Weightlifters at the 1952 Summer Olympics
Weightlifters at the 1956 Summer Olympics
Sportspeople from Quebec City
Commonwealth Games medallists in weightlifting
Commonwealth Games silver medallists for Canada
Weightlifters at the 1954 British Empire and Commonwealth Games
20th-century Canadian people
21st-century Canadian people
Medallists at the 1954 British Empire and Commonwealth Games